Arie van Leeuwen (3 February 1910 – 9 August 2000) was a Dutch hurdler. He competed in the men's 110 metres hurdles at the 1928 Summer Olympics.

References

1910 births
2000 deaths
Athletes (track and field) at the 1928 Summer Olympics
Dutch male hurdlers
Olympic athletes of the Netherlands
Sportspeople from Haarlem